Events in the year 1835 in Brazil.

Incumbents
 Monarch – Pedro II

Events

January
January 6 - Cabanagem: rebels attack and conquer the city of Belém, assassinating the president Sousa Lobo and the Army Commander, and acquiring a large quantity of munitions.
January 7 - Cabanagem: Clement Malcher was released and was chosen as president of the province, with Francisco Vinagre as the Army Commander
January 24 - Malê Revolt

September
19 September - Battle of Azenha Bridge
20 September - outbreak of the Ragamuffin War

Births
May 23 - José Alves de Cerqueira César, politician

Deaths
February 20 - Clemente Malcher, rebel leader (assassinated)

References

 
1830s in Brazil
Years of the 19th century in Brazil
Brazil
Brazil